Valerie Taylor (10 November 1902 in Fulham, London – 24 October 1988 in London) was an English actor. After graduating from the Royal Academy of Dramatic Art in 1922, her stage work included appearances at Stratford, as well as the original West End and Broadway productions of Berkeley Square in 1926 and 1929. She also reprised her role in the 1933 Hollywood film version of the same. She was married to the actor Hugh Sinclair (1903 - 1962). Besides her acting credits, she also co-wrote the screenplay to the 1947 movie Take My Life.

Filmography

Selected stage credits
 Berkeley Square (1926) by John L. Balderston 
 On Approval (1927) by Frederick Lonsdale
 Call It a Day (1935) by Dodie Smith
 Dear Octopus (1938) by Dodie Smith
 The Wind of Heaven (1945) by Emlyn Williams
 Happy with Either (1948) by Margaret Kennedy
 Venus Observed (1950) by Christopher Fry
 The Living Room (1953) by Graham Greene
 Eighty in the Shade (1958) by Clemence Dane

References

External links

1902 births
1988 deaths
English stage actresses
English film actresses
English television actresses
People from Fulham
Actresses from London
20th-century English actresses
Alumni of RADA